Ochna angustata is a species of plant in the family Ochnaceae. It is endemic to Mozambique.

References

Flora of Mozambique
angustata
Near threatened flora of Africa
Endemic flora of Mozambique
Taxonomy articles created by Polbot